Minuwangoda Divisional Secretariat is a  Divisional Secretariat  of Gampaha District, of Western Province, Sri Lanka.

Grama Niladhari Divisions Of Minuwangoda.

Census.

Census Of Population By Ethnicity.

Census Of Population By Religion.

Census Of Population By Gender.

References

 Minuwangoda Divisional Secretariat

Divisional Secretariats of Gampaha District